In mathematics, a separoid is a binary relation between disjoint sets which is stable as an ideal in the canonical order induced by inclusion. Many mathematical objects which appear to be quite different, find a common generalisation in the framework of separoids; e.g., graphs, configurations of convex sets, oriented matroids, and polytopes. Any countable category is an induced subcategory of separoids when they are endowed with homomorphisms (viz., mappings that preserve the so-called minimal Radon partitions).

In this general framework, some results and invariants of different categories turn out to be special cases of the same aspect; e.g., the pseudoachromatic number from graph theory and the Tverberg theorem from combinatorial convexity are simply two faces of the same aspect, namely, complete colouring of separoids.

The axioms 

A separoid is a set  endowed with a binary relation  on its power set, which satisfies the following simple properties for :

 
 
 

A related pair  is called a separation and we often say that A is separated from B. It is enough to know the maximal separations to reconstruct the separoid.

A mapping  is a morphism of separoids if the preimages of separations are separations; that is, for

Examples 

Examples of separoids can be found in almost every branch of mathematics. Here we list just a few.

1. Given a graph G=(V,E), we can define a separoid on its vertices by saying that two (disjoint) subsets of V, say A and B, are separated if there are no edges going from one to the other; i.e.,

 

2. Given an oriented matroid M = (E,T), given in terms of its topes T, we can define a separoid on E by saying that two subsets are separated if they are contained in opposite signs of a tope. In other words, the topes of an oriented matroid are the maximal separations of a separoid. This example includes, of course, all directed graphs.

3. Given a family of objects in a Euclidean space, we can define a separoid in it by saying that two subsets are separated if there exists a hyperplane that separates them; i.e., leaving them in the two opposite sides of it.

4. Given a topological space, we can define a separoid saying that two subsets are separated if there exist two disjoint open sets which contains them (one for each of them).

The basic lemma 

Every separoid can be represented with a family of convex sets in some Euclidean space and their separations by hyperplanes.

References

Further reading 
 
 
 
 

Binary relations